Pat Broderick (born November 26, 1953) is an American comics artist, known for his work on the Micronauts and Alpha Flight for Marvel Comics, and Legion of Super-Heroes, Captain Atom and Green Lantern for DC Comics. Broderick also pencilled the four-part "Batman: Year Three" storyline, written by Marv Wolfman, which detailed the first meeting of Batman and Dick Grayson as well as Tim Drake's first appearance.

Career

Comics
Soon after graduating from high school in Tampa, Florida, Broderick flew to New York in the early 1970s to compete in DC Comics' junior bullpen program, a nationwide art and writing contest held at the July 4 convention at the Commodore Hotel. Presenting his work to DC editors Sol Harrison and Joe Orlando, Broderick was almost immediately placed in the junior bullpen program and drew filler pages and short stories for various 100 Page Super Spectaculars. During this period, Broderick also worked for Neal Adams and Dick Giordano's Continuity Associates as a member of the Crusty Bunkers.

In 1975, after sporadic work with DC and Marvel, Broderick joined the team at Atlas Comics. His time at Atlas was short-lived, and Broderick soon found himself back at Marvel, working on various titles for their black-and-white line, Curtis Magazines. This led to working on Captain Marvel and then The Micronauts. He drew the Micronauts series from #19 (July 1980) to #34 (Oct. 1981). 

Writer J. M. DeMatteis and Broderick created the Creature Commandos in Weird War Tales #93 (November 1980). In 1981, he abruptly left Marvel for DC. As he said in a 2003 interview, "Jim Shooter had all but informed me that, in his opinion, my art sucked and that I would never get another raise there, regardless of how well my books were selling. So one quick phone call to DC and I was in." Broderick was one of the artists on the double-sized Justice League of America #200 (March 1982). He and writer Gerry Conway launched The Fury of Firestorm in June 1982. Broderick briefly drew the Batman feature in Detective Comics in 1985.  Captain Atom, a Charlton Comics character purchased by DC, was given an ongoing series in March 1987 which was written by Cary Bates and drawn by Broderick. Writer Marv Wolfman and Broderick created Tim Drake in the "Batman: Year Three" story. Broderick drew the  Swamp Thing series from 1989 to 1990 and then launched the Green Lantern volume 3 series with Gerard Jones. 

After ten years at DC, Broderick's relationship with that company soured. According to him, he "was being abused by [his] editors, Andy Helfer and Kevin Dooley, and was really just fed up with their attitude." Shooter was no longer at Marvel which offered him work again and Broderick returned, where he worked as the regular penciller first on Alpha Flight and Doom 2099.

Advertising 
In 1995, Broderick turned to advertising full-time, moving to Dallas to lead the in-house creative department at Tracy Locke and Partnership. The company handled packaging, print, and television ads for PepsiCo, Frito-Lay, Pizza Hut, Federal Express, Harrah's Casinos, and Hasbro. This led to design work for DNA Productions on the 2001 movie, Jimmy Neutron: Boy Genius.

Later career
In 2003, Broderick returned to comics with the short-lived Future Comics. He was scheduled to work on the title Peacekeepers, but it was never published, and Future went out of business shortly thereafter. In 2004, Devil's Due Publishing revived Micronauts, with Broderick returning to the title. He drew three issues before it was cancelled. That same year, Broderick was a member of the animation department faculty at Tampa's International Academy of Design and Technology.

Broderick was elected an Inkwell Awards Ambassador in January 2018. In August 2018, Broderick was elevated to Special Ambassador status. His term of service ended in May 2020.

Art style 
Broderick is known for his detailed, expressive art, and his characters' large eyes. There is some resemblance between Broderick's art and Michael Golden's late 1970s style. Broderick has acknowledged his admiration of Golden's work.

Through his career, Broderick has often teamed with inker Bruce Patterson on such titles as Alpha Flight, Green Lantern, Detective Comics, Legion of Super-Heroes, and Captain Planet and the Planeteers.

Bibliography

Atlas/Seaboard Comics
 Blazing Battle Tales #1 (1975)
 Phoenix #3 (1975)
 Planet of Vampires #1–2 (1975)

DC Comics
 Batman #256–258; #436–439 (1974–1989)
 The Brave and the Bold #113–114 (three pages each) (1974)
 Captain Atom #1–19, 21–28, Annual #1–2 (1988–1989)
 COPS #1–2, 5–10, 13 (1988–1989)
 DC Science Fiction Graphic Novel #7 (1987)
 Detective Comics #442 (one page); #490–491, 547–552 (1974–1985)
 The Flash #303–304 (1981)
 The Fury of Firestorm #1–7, 10–17, 22 (1982–1984)
 G.I. Combat #260 (1983)
 Green Lantern vol. 3 #1–8, 13, 19–24 (1990–1992)
 House of Mystery #226 (three pages) (1974)
 Justice League of America #111 (three pages); #200 (1974–1982)
 Legion of Super-Heroes vol. 2 #284–287, 309 (1982–1984)
 Legion of Super-Heroes vol. 3 #46–47, 49 (1988)
 Lords of the Ultra-Realm #1–6, Special #1 (1986–1987)
 New Guardians #10–12 (1989)
 The New Teen Titans vol. 2 #35 (1987)
 Ragman vol. 2 #1–8 (1991–1992)
 Secret Origins vol. 3 #9 (2015)
 Shazam! #13 (four pages) (1974)
 Swamp Thing vol. 2 #90–93, 95–97, 99–100, Annual #4 (1988–1990)
 Sword of the Atom Special #3 (1988)
 The Unexpected #218 (1982)
 Warlord #79, Annual #4 (1984–1985)
 Weird War Tales #93, 107–108 (1980–1982)
 Who's Who in the DC Universe #3–7, 11, 14 (1990–1991)
 Who's Who in the Legion of Super-Heroes #1 (1988)
 Who's Who: The Definitive Directory of the DC Universe #2–5, 7, 16 (1985–1986)
 Who's Who: Update '87 #1–2, 4 (1987)
 Who's Who Update '88 #1, 4 (1988)
 The Witching Hour #81 (1978)
 World's Finest Comics #225 (one page) (1974)

Milestone Media
 Blood Syndicate #32 (1995)

Paradox Press
 The Big Book of Bad (1998)
 The Big Book of Conspiracies (1995)
 The Big Book of Little Criminals (1996)
 The Big Book of the Weird Wild West (1998)
 The Big Book of Urban Legends (1994)

Devil's Due Publishing
 Micronauts #1–3 (2004)

Eclipse Comics
 Sun Runners #4–5 (1984–1985)

Marvel Comics
 Alpha Flight #109–112, 114–120, 122–124, Special #1 (1992–1993)
 Battlestar Galactica #10 (1979)
 Captain Marvel #55–62 (1978–1979)
 Captain Planet and the Planeteers #3–4 (1991–1992)
 Crazy Magazine #68–69, 75, 77 (1980–1981)
 Deadly Hands of Kung Fu #18, 25 (1975–1976)
 Deathlok Annual #1 (1992)
 Doom 2099 #1–8, 10–12, 14–15, 17–30 (1993–1995)
 Haunt of Horror #3 (1974)
 Marvel Comics Presents #118 (1992)
 Marvel Fanfare #25–26 (Weirdworld) (1986)
 Marvel Holiday Special #3 (1994)
 Marvel Premiere #23–24 (Iron Fist) (1975)
 Marvel Spotlight vol. 2 #1–3 (Captain Marvel) (1979)
 Marvel Team-Up #91 (1980)
 Master of Kung Fu #70 (1978)
 Micronauts #19–34 (1980–1981)
 Punisher vol. 3 #5–6 (1996)
 Quasar #30 (1992)
 Red Sonja vol. 3 #5–6 (1985)
 The Sensational Spider-Man '96 #1 (1996)
 Spider-Man #62 (1995)
 Spider-Man and X-Factor: Shadowgames #1–3 (1994)
 Unknown Worlds of Science Fiction #6 (one page) (1975)
 What If...? #19 (Spider-Man) (1980)

Pacific Comics
 Sun Runners #1–2 (1984)

Shadow House Press
 Shadow House #1–5 (1997–1998)

References

External links 

 Pat Broderick at Mike's Amazing World of Comics
 Pat Broderick at the Unofficial Handbook of Marvel Comics Creators
 Innerspace Online part 1
 Innerspace Online part 2

1953 births
Advertising artists and illustrators
American comics artists
Animation educators
Living people
Artists from Tampa, Florida